Face climbing is a type of climbing where climbers use features and irregularities in the rock such as finger pockets and edges to ascend a vertical rock face. Face climbing is contrasted with crack climbing. Face climbing is less reliant upon technique than crack climbing, but instead relies more upon body position.

Techniques 
Holds can be used in a variety of ways by your feet and hands as you move up the rock

Manteling 
The mantel is a specific use of down-pressure technique. Pushing down with your hands you allow your feet to reach the same hold your hands are on.

Stemming 
Stemming is a counterforce technique where you support yourself between two spots by pressing in opposite directions.

Undercling 
A hold that requires your palms to face upwards instead of downwards.  Your arms will pull while your feet push.

References

Types of climbing